A squeeze or squeeze paper is a reverse copy of an inscription, made by applying moist filter paper and pushing into the indentations by percussive use of a stiff brush. The paper is allowed to dry and then removed.  The image is reversed from the inscription, and  protrudes from the squeeze paper.

The use of a squeeze allows more information to be gleaned than examining the original inscription, for example curves inside the cuts can identify the scribe who originally carved the inscription.

Squeezes can also (and some have been since the 1950s) be made by applying layers of liquid latex.  This method works best on horizontal surfaces.

Modern digitising methods mean that the image can be restored to the original orientation.

Large collections of squeezes are held by the Inscriptiones Graecae and other epigraphic collections.

See also
Rubbing
 Brass rubbing

References

External links
 Squeeze making at the Smithsonian Institution (Archived here)
 Squeeze Making in the Athenian Agora

Epigraphy